This is the discography of British singer Maxine Nightingale.

Albums

Studio albums

Compilation albums

Singles

References

Discographies of British artists
Rhythm and blues discographies
Soul music discographies
Disco discographies